The 8th Dallas–Fort Worth Film Critics Association Awards, honoring the best in film for 2002, were given on January 6, 2003. The organization, founded in 1990, includes 59 film critics for print, radio, television, and internet publications based in north Texas.

Top 10 films
Chicago (Academy Award for Best Picture)
Far from Heaven
The Lord of the Rings: The Two Towers
The Pianist
About Schmidt
Gangs of New York
Adaptation.
Road to Perdition
Catch Me If You Can
The Hours

Winners

Best Actor:
Jack Nicholson – About Schmidt as Warren R. Schmidt
Best Actress:
Julianne Moore – Far from Heaven
Best Animated Film:
Spirited Away (Sen to Chihiro no kamikakushi)
Best Cinematography:
Far from Heaven – Edward Lachman
Best Director:
Peter Jackson – The Lord of the Rings: The Two Towers
Best Documentary Film:
Bowling for Columbine
Best Film:
 Chicago 
Best Foreign Language Film:
And Your Mother Too (Y tu mamá también) • Mexico
Best Supporting Actor:
Chris Cooper – Adaptation. as John Laroche
Best Supporting Actress:
Kathy Bates – About Schmidt
Worst Film:
FeardotCom

References

External links
Dallas-Fort Worth Film Critics Association official website

2002
2002 film awards